Kimberley is a city in southeast British Columbia, Canada along Highway 95A between the Purcell and Rocky Mountains. Kimberley was named in 1896 after the Kimberley mine in South Africa. From 1917 to 2001, it was the home to the world's largest lead-zinc mine, the Sullivan Mine. Now it is mainly a tourist destination and home to the Kimberley Alpine Resort, a ski area and Kimberley's Underground Mining Railway that features a  underground mining interpretive centre complete with operational  narrow-gauge railway equipment. Recreational pursuits include world-class skiing, snowboarding, snowmobiling, fishing, whitewater rafting, kayaking, biking, hiking and golfing on championship golf courses. The city has the largest urban park in Canada. At , the Kimberley Nature Park is the largest incorporated park in Canada.

SunMine, was the largest solar PV plant in Western Canada when built in 2015 on the site of the former Sullivan Mine concentrator.

History 
Kimberley incorporated as a city on March 29, 1944. It amalgamated with the former Village of Marysville on November 1, 1968. Following the routing of Highway 95 away from the city, in 1972 Kimberley transformed into the Bavarian City of the Rockies to entice motorists passing through the region to visit. Kimberley's Mine was the Sullivan Mine, and it was the largest lead-zinc mine in the world. The mine ceased operation in 2001.

Demographics

Although its historical population was closely tied to activities at the Sullivan Mine, the city's high-speed internet and scenic location enabled growth in tech and tourism beginning in the 2000s.

Ethnicity

Religion 
According to the 2021 census, religious groups in Kimberley included:
Irreligion (5,210 persons or 65.6%)
Christianity (2,555 persons or 32.2%)
Buddhism (45 persons or 0.6%)
Hinduism (20 persons or 0.3%)
Other (105 persons or 1.3%)

Tourism and transportation 

The city has the "largest freestanding cuckoo clock in Canada". It began to develop a Bavarian-themed village in the 1970s after taking inspiration from Leavenworth, Washington.

Kimberley is also home to a professional summer theatre which typically produces a mainstage musical at the local theatre and a free outdoor vaudeville show in the Platzl. Past productions include:You're a Good Man, Charlie Brown, Where's Charley?, By Jeeves, Lend Me A Tenor, Secrets Every Smart Traveler Should Know and several original scripts featuring local material. 
Kimberley Summer Theatre's mandate is to produce affordable but professional theatre for all ages. Productions are housed at the 125-seat "Centre 64". KST alumni include Elicia MacKenzie, winner of the CBC Television contest How Do You Solve a Problem Like Maria?.

Kimberley is served by the Canadian Rockies International Airport that has been expanded, and is expected by many to have a positive impact on commerce and tourism in the Kimberley area. The airport expansion will accommodate large charter and scheduled flights, opening up the area to more vacationers from across the country and abroad.

Schools 
Schools in Kimberley are part of School District 6 Rocky Mountain which also serves Invermere and Golden. Five of the district schools are in Kimberley.
 Blarchmont Elementary School (closed as of September, 2006) and now home of the College of the Rockies Kimberley Campus
 Selkirk Secondary School
 McKim Elementary School (changed from a Middle School to a 4 to 7 school as of September, 2006)
 Marysville Elementary School
 Lindsay Park Elementary School
 Continuing Education School
 Kimberley Alternate School

Other schools accredited by the government:
 Kimberley Independent School (pre-K to grade 9)

Climate 

Kimberley has a continental climate with semi-arid influences and heavy moderation from the nearby mountains which tend to block arctic air masses, and produce a rain shadow. Its fairly high elevation counters this effect slightly, as temperatures are somewhat cooler and the town slightly more rainy than it would otherwise be.

Sports 
The Kimberley Dynamiters Junior B Ice Hockey team play in the Kootenay International Junior Hockey League (KIJHL). The Dynamiters have produced many professional hockey players, including Jason Wiemer, who last played with the New Jersey Devils of the National Hockey League (NHL).

Kimberley Alpine Resort regularly hosts ski races on the IPC Disabled Alpine World Cup. It is known as the sunniest resort in British Columbia, and offers a wide range of runs, for all levels. Kimberley Alpine Resort is also home to the Winter Sports School which hosts lessons for all ages, and abilities, such as Black Forest Tours.

There are five major golf courses to play, Trickle Creek Golf Resort, which, along with Trickle Creek Lodge and Kimberley Alpine Resort, is owned by Resorts of the Canadian Rockies Inc., Bootleg Gap Golf Course, Kimberley Golf Club, and just 15 – 20 minutes away are the St Eugene Golf Resort and Shadow Mountain Golf Course, both of which have received rave reviews for their quality and incredible scenery. Additionally, new investment in the area is producing another golf course known as Wild Stone. The areas around Kimberley also have premiere golf courses, making Kimberley and the surrounding area a golf tourism destination.

There is an annual ultra marathon at Kimberley Alpine Resort, the Black Spur Ultra. Runners choose between 54 km and 108 km distances.

Notable people 
 Stanley Hayer, former Olympian and current head coach of the Canadian ski cross team
 Rosalind C. Morris, Columbia University anthropologist, Guggenheim Fellow
 Gerry Sorensen, former alpine skier
Daniel Sullivan, ice hockey goaltender
 Jason Wiemer, retired NHL player

Notes

References

External links 

Cities in British Columbia
Populated places in the Regional District of East Kootenay